Minuscule 143 (in the Gregory-Aland numbering), A 125 (Soden), is a Greek minuscule manuscript of the New Testament, on parchment leaves. Paleographically it has been assigned to the 11th century. It has marginalia.

Description 

The codex contains the text of the four Gospels on 275 thick parchment leaves (size ). The text is written in one column per page, 24 lines per page. Size of the text . The large initial letters in gold.

There is also a division according to the Ammonian Sections, with references to the Eusebian Canons (written below Ammonian Section numbers).

It contains a marginal commentary (Victor's on Mark).

Text 
The Greek text of the codex is a representative of the Byzantine text-type. Aland placed it in Category V.

According to the Claremont Profile Method it represents textual family Kx in Luke 1, Luke 10, and Luke 20. It belongs to the textual cluster Ω.

History 
On the first leaf is read, it was presented to Paul IV, a Pope (1555–1559).

It was examined by Birch (about 1782) and Scholz. C. R. Gregory saw the manuscript in 1886.

It is currently housed at the Vatican Library (Vat. gr. 1229), at Rome.

See also 
 List of New Testament minuscules
 Biblical manuscript
 Textual criticism

References

Further reading 

 

Greek New Testament minuscules
11th-century biblical manuscripts
Manuscripts of the Vatican Library